Love Is No Crime is the third studio album by German band Bad Boys Blue. It was released on 12 October 1987 by Coconut Records. The album includes one international hit, "Come Back and Stay". Two singles were released from the record: "Come Back and Stay" and "Gimme Gimme Your Lovin' (Little Lady)". 

Hans-Jürgen Fritz, who used to play keyboards for the german prog band Triumvirat, makes a comeback appearance on keyboards and drum programming. He also co-wrote 3 songs and helped on the arrangements.

Track listing
"Come Back and Stay" – 7:35    
"If You Call on Me" – 3:32   
"Victim of Your Love" – 4:29   
"Love Is No Crime" – 3:35   
"Gimme Gimme Your Lovin' (Little Lady)" – 3:49   
"I Remember Mary" – 4:57   
"Charlene" – 4:26   
"Inside of Me" – 4:34   
"Why (Misty Eyes)" – 4:57   
"Kiss You All Over, Baby (New Version)" – 4:12

Personnel
Bad Boys Blue
Trevor Taylor – lead vocals (3, 5, 7, 8, 9, 10)
John McInerney – lead vocals (1, 2, 4, 6)
Andrew Thomas – backing vocals

Additional personnel
Hans-Jürgen Fritz – keyboards, drum programming
Günter Lammers – keyboards
John Parsons – guitars
Tony Hendrik – drum programming

Credits
All tracks written by Tony Hendrik and Karin van Haaren except 3 and 8 written by Hans-Jürgen Fritz and Trevor Taylor
7 and 10 written by Tony Hendrik, M. Applegate, Karin van Haaren 
9 written by Jürgen Fritz and K.-D. Gebauer
All songs arranged by Tony Hendrik, Jürgen Fritz, and Günther Lammers
Recorded and mixed at Coconut Studios, Hennef, Germany.
Produced by Tony Hendrik and Karin Hartmann.

References

External links
ALBUM - Love Is No Crime

1987 albums
Bad Boys Blue albums